The 2015 Kuomintang chairmanship by-election was held on 17 January 2015 in Taiwan. This was the sixth direct election of the chairman in the Kuomintang history. All registered, due-paying KMT party members were eligible to vote.

History
The election was called after Ma Ying-jeou resigned from the Kuomintang Chairmanship to take responsibility for the party's heavy losses during the local elections held on 29 November 2014. Six KMT members, among them Clara Chou and Lee Hsin, attempted to register for the election, but five were rejected. Eric Chu, who had just been reelected Mayor of New Taipei in the November elections, was the only officially confirmed candidate.

Result
Chu garnered 99.61% of all votes, beating the previous record in 2001.

Reactions
 Democratic Progressive Party - Chairperson Tsai Ing-wen sent congratulatory flowers and a message to KMT headquarters after the polls closed. The message read, in part, "heavy responsibilities, long road ahead."
 Communist Party of China - General Secretary Xi Jinping congratulated Chu immediately after the election. He expressed that the two sides of the Taiwan Strait could continue adhering the 1992 Consensus and oppose Taiwan independence to push for the peaceful development of Cross-Strait relations.

See also
 Elections in the Republic of China
 List of leaders of the Kuomintang

References

2015 elections in Taiwan
Kuomintang
January 2015 events in Asia
2015
Kuomintang chairmanship by-election
Single-candidate elections